Keishen Bean (born March 17, 1987) is a Bermudian footballer who currently plays for North Village Rams in the Bermudian Premier Division.

Club career
Bean began his career with the Bermuda Hogges in the USL Second Division, until transferring to Ottawa Fury prior to the beginning of the 2009 PDL season.
Bean is also playing with CBU Capers of the CIS.  In 2009, he was selected to the 2009 AUS first team all-star. Keishen earned PDL 1st Team All conference honours in 2011 for a stand out season with the Hogges. Keishen continued his success into the 2011 Cape Breton CIS season earning CIS Athlete of the week honors.

International career
He made his debut for Bermuda in a September 2006 CONCACAF Gold Cup qualification match against the US Virgin Islands and has, as of November 2015, earned a total of 17 caps, scoring 2 goals. He has represented his country in 8 FIFA World Cup qualification matches. He played in all four of Bermuda's qualifying games for the 2010 FIFA World Cup, including their 3–1 victory over the Cayman Islands on March 30, 2008, and their historic 2–1 victory over Trinidad and Tobago on June 15, 2008.

International goals
Scores and results list Bermuda's goal tally first.

References

External links

 Profile - CBU Capers

1987 births
Living people
Association football midfielders
Bermudian footballers
Bermuda international footballers
Lynn Fighting Knights men's soccer players
North Village Rams players
Bermuda Hogges F.C. players
Ottawa Fury (2005–2013) players
USL Second Division players
USL League Two players
Bermudian expatriate footballers
Expatriate soccer players in the United States
Expatriate soccer players in Canada
Bermudian expatriate sportspeople in the United States
Bermudian expatriate sportspeople in Canada